Sachko Iliev is a Bulgarian sprint canoer who competed in the late 1960s and early 1970s. He won a bronze medal in the C-2 1000 m event at the 1970 ICF Canoe Sprint World Championships in Copenhagen.

References

Bulgarian male canoeists
Living people
Year of birth missing (living people)
ICF Canoe Sprint World Championships medalists in Canadian